Myrcia flavoviridis is a species of plant in the family Myrtaceae. It is endemic to Cuba and is threatened by habitat loss.

References

Endemic flora of Cuba
flavoviridis
Critically endangered plants
Taxonomy articles created by Polbot